Antoni Reiter (16 March 1950 – 10 February 1986) was a Polish judoka. He competed in the men's half-heavyweight event at the 1976 Summer Olympics.

References

External links
 

1950 births
1986 deaths
Polish male judoka
Olympic judoka of Poland
Judoka at the 1976 Summer Olympics
Sportspeople from Gdańsk
Suicides in Poland